The  is a Japanese order, established in 1875 by Emperor Meiji. The Order was the first national decoration awarded by the Japanese government, created on 10 April 1875 by decree of the Council of State. The badge features rays of sunlight from the rising sun. The design of the Rising Sun symbolizes energy as powerful as the rising sun in parallel with the "rising sun" concept of Japan ("Land of the Rising Sun").

The Order of the Rising Sun is awarded to people who have rendered distinguished service to the state in various fields except military service. Since there is no order for military achievements under the current Japanese system, Japan Self-Defense Forces personnel are awarded the Order of the Sacred Treasure for their long engagement in public service. Prior to the end of World War II, it was also awarded for exemplary military service. In 2003, the 7th and 8th Class, which were at the bottom of the Order of the Rising Sun, were abolished, and the upper half of the 1st Class  (勲一等, Kun-ittō) was separated as the Order of the Paulownia Flowers, which was higher than the Order of the Rising Sun.

Until 2003, the Order of the Rising Sun was on the same rank as the Order of the Precious Crown, with the Order of the Rising Sun being for men only and the Order of the Precious Crown for women only. The Order of the Sacred Treasure was treated as an order of slightly lower rank than the Order of the Rising Sun and the Order of the Precious Crown. For example, the 1st class of the Order of the Sacred Treasure was placed between the 1st class and the 2nd class of the Order of the Rising Sun and the Order of the Precious Crown, and the 2nd class of the Order of the Sacred Treasure was placed between the 2nd class and the 3rd class of the Order of the Rising Sun and the Order of the Precious Crown.

Since 2003, the Order of the Rising Sun has been awarded not only to men but also to women, and the Order of the Precious Crown has become a special order given only to female members of the imperial family in Japan and female members of royal families in foreign countries, only when it is specifically necessary for diplomatic ceremonies. The Order of the Rising Sun and the Order of the Sacred Treasure became the same rank of orders, and one of them came to be awarded because of the difference in the viewpoint of contribution to the state. The Order of the Rising Sun is awarded with an emphasis on achievements to the state, and the Order of the Sacred Treasure is awarded with an emphasis on long-term public service.

While it is the third highest order bestowed by the Japanese government, it is however generally the highest ordinarily conferred order. The highest Japanese order, the Order of the Chrysanthemum, is reserved for heads of state or royalty, while the second highest order, the Order of the Paulownia Flowers, is mostly reserved for politicians.

The modern version of this honour has been conferred on non-Japanese recipients beginning in 1981 (although several foreigners were given the honor before World War II). The awarding of the Order is administered by the Decoration Bureau of the Cabinet Office headed by the Japanese Prime Minister. It is awarded in the name of the Emperor and can be awarded posthumously.

Since 2003, the number representing rank included in the official name of the order was removed. As a result, although numbers representing ranks were sometimes used in common names, the formal names such as 勲一等 (Kun-ittō, First Class) and 勲二等 (Kun-nitō, Second Class) were no longer used.

Criteria for awarding 

The Order of the Rising Sun is awarded to the following;
 A person who has contributed to the stability and development of the international community.
 A person who has contributed to the realization of appropriate tax payment.
 A person who has contributed to the promotion of school education or social education.
 A person who has contributed to the promotion of culture or sports.
 A person who has contributed to the promotion of science and technology.
 A person who has contributed to the improvement and promotion of social welfare.
 A person who has contributed to the improvement and promotion of the health or public health of citizens.
 A person who has contributed to the improvement of the working environment for workers.
 A person who has contributed to environmental conservation.
 A person who is engaged in the business of agriculture, forestry, fisheries, commerce, mining, industry, information and communications industry, construction industry, real estate industry, finance and insurance industry, service industry, etc., and has contributed to the public interest by developing the economy and industry.
 A person who has contributed to the public interest by engaging in the services of an attorney, certified public accountant, patent attorney, etc.
 A person who has contributed to the public interest by engaging in the work of newspapers, broadcasting or other news reporting.
 A person who has engaged in a public interest business such as Electricity Business, Gas Business, Transportation Business, etc. and has contributed to the promotion of public welfare.
 A person other than those listed in the preceding items who has contributed to the public interest.

Among them, regulations on the criteria for awarding orders to those who belong to the National Diet, the central and local governments, and courts stipulate in detail which ranks are awarded for each position. For example, the Grand Cordon of the Order of the Rising Sun (1st class) is awarded to a person who has made outstanding achievements in his/her position as Prime Minister, Speaker of the House of Representatives, President of the House of Councillors, or Chief Justice of Japan. The Grand Cordon of the Order of the Rising Sun (1st class) or the Order of the Rising Sun, Gold and Silver Rays (2nd class) are awarded to a person who has made outstanding achievements in his/her position as Minister of State, Deputy Chief Cabinet Secretary, Senior Vice-Minister, Vice Speaker of the House of Representatives, Vice President of the House of Councilors, or Judge of the Supreme Court.

Classes 
The Order was awarded in nine classes until 2003, when the Grand Cordon with Paulownia Flowers was made a separate order, and the lowest two classes were abolished. Since then, it has been awarded in six classes. Conventionally, a diploma is prepared to accompany the insignia of the order, and in some rare instances, the personal signature of the Emperor will have been added. As an illustration of the wording of the text, a translation of a representative 1929 diploma says:

Insignia 
The star for the Grand Cordon and Second Class is a silver star of eight points, each point having three alternating silver rays; the central emblem is identical to the badge. It is worn on the left chest for the Grand Cordon, on the right chest for the 2nd Class.

The badge for the Grand Cordon to Sixth Classes is an eight-pointed badge bearing a central red enamelled sun disc, with gilt points (1st–4th Classes), with four gilt and four silver points (5th Class), or with silver points (6th Class); each point comprises three white enamelled rays. It is suspended from three enamelled paulownia leaves (not chrysanthemum leaves as the Decoration Bureau page claims) on a ribbon in white with red border stripes, worn as a sash from the right shoulder for the Grand Cordon, as a necklet for the 2nd and 3rd Classes and on the left chest for the 4th to 6th Classes (with a rosette for the 4th Class).

The badge for the Seventh and Eighth Classes consisted of a silver medal in the shape of three paulownia leaves, enamelled for the 7th Class and plain for the 8th Class. Both were suspended on a ribbon, again in white with red border stripes, and worn on the left chest. Both classes were abolished in 2003 and replaced by the Order of the Paulownia Flowers, a single-class order that now ranks above the Order of the Rising Sun.

Notable recipients

1st Class, Grand Cordon 

 Tony Abbott (1957–), Former Australian Prime Minister, 2022
 Aziz Abduhakimov, 2022
 Syed Hamid Albar, 2019
 Edmund Allenby, 1921
 James F. Amos, 2014
 Michael Armacost, 2007
 Richard Armitage, 2015
 Pridi Banomyong (1900–1983)
 Arthur Barrett, 1921
 Edmund Barton (1849–1920), Former Australian Prime Minister, 1905
 Carol Bellamy, 2006
 Felix von Bendemann, 1906
 Abdelmalek Benhabyles, 2012
 Charles Reed Bishop (1822–1915)
 Dennis C. Blair, 2001
 Sepp Blatter, 2009
 Gustave Emile Boissonade (1825–1910), 1909
 Sydney Brenner (1927–2019), 2017
 Laurens Jan Brinkhorst, 2009
 Arleigh Burke (1901–1996)
 Erwin Bälz (1849–1913), 1905
 George W. Casey Jr. 2010
 Krasae Chanawongse, 2004
 Dick Cheney, 2018
 Helen Clark, 2017
 James Wheeler Davidson (1872–1933), 1896
 Kemal Derviş, 2009
 Malcolm Fraser, (1930-2015) Former Australian Prime Minister, 2006
 Jerome Isaac Friedman, 2016
 Bill Gates (1955–), Co-chair of the Bill & Melinda Gates Foundation, 2020
 Robert Gates, 2017
 Thamir Ghadhban, 2016
Julia Gillard (1961–), Former Australian Prime Minister, 2021
David L. Goldfein, 2021 
 Sir Stephen Gomersall KCMG, 2015
 Hermann Göring (1893–1946)
 António Guterres, 2002
 William Hague, 2017
 Sri Sultan Hamengkubuwono IX (1912–1988)
 John Hamre, 2016
 Kenzaburo Hara (1907–2004), 1996
 Harry B. Harris Jr., 2018
 Dennis Hastert, 2010
 Bob Hawke (1929-2019), Former Australian Prime Minister, 2012
 Musa Hitam, 2018
 Soichiro Honda (1906–1991), 1991
 John Howard (1939-), Former Australian Prime Minister, 2013
 Masaru Ibuka (1908–1997), 1997
 Daniel Inouye, 2000
 Henry Jackson (1855–1929)
 S. Jayakumar, 2012
 Karu Jayasuriya (1940–), 2016
 Anerood Jugnauth, 1988
 Henk Kamp, 2014
 Ginandjar Kartasasmita (1941–), 2008
 Caroline Kennedy (1957–), 2021
 Abhakara Kiartivongse, 1900
 Thanom Kittikachorn
 Bert Koenders, 2014
 Komura Jutarō (1855–1911)
 Jorge Kosmas Sifaki 2014
 Sir John Kotelawala (1895–1980), 1954
 V. Krishnamurthy, 2009
 Wataru Kubo, 2001
 Ashwani Kumar, 2017
 Lee Hsien Loong (1952–), 2016
 Lee Kuan Yew (1923–2015), 1967
 Curtis LeMay (1906–1990) 1964
 Queen Liliʻuokalani (1838–1917), 1882
 Wangari Maathai, 2009
 Ibrahim Mabrouk (1873–1959), 1934
 Douglas MacArthur (1880–1964), 1960
 Sir John Major, 2012
 Mike Mansfield, 1990
 Baron Yasutake Matsuoka, 1906
 Yōsuke Matsuoka, 1940
 John McCain, 2018
 John McEwen, 1973
 Franz-Michael Skjold Mellbin, 2011
 Robert Menzies (1894–1978), Former Australian Prime Minister, 1973
 Norman Yoshio Mineta (1931–2022), 2007
 Phumzile Mlambo-Ngcuka (1955–), 2022
 Amina C. Mohamed, 2017
 Mahathir Mohamad, 1991
 Ernest Moniz, 2017
 Ivan Mrkić, 2018
 Hendrik Pieter Nicolaas Muller (1859–1941)
 A. M. Nair, alias "Nair-San"
 Ben Ngubane, 2010
 Peter Pace, 2007
 Rear Admiral Ali Osman Pasha, 1890
 Andrew Peacock, Former Australian politician and diplomat, 2017
 Nancy Pelosi, 2015
 William J. Perry, 2002
 John J. Pershing, 1918 
 Plaek Phibunsongkhram, 1942
 Józef Piłsudski, 1928
 Herbert Plumer (1857–1932)
 Ram Chandra Poudel, 2020
 Condoleezza Rice, 2017
 Edward A. Rice Jr.
 Jay Rockefeller, 2013
 Herman Van Rompuy, 2015
 Donald Rumsfeld, 2015
 Eishiro Saito, in 1992
 Saisho Atsushi, 1906
 Klaus Schwab, 2013
 Abid Sharifov, 2016
 Count Paul de Smet de Naeyer,
 Shoichiro Toyoda, 2002
 Chea Sim, 2013
 Dr. Manmohan Singh, 2014
 Edward Śmigły-Rydz, (1886–1941)
 Isamu Takeshita (1869–1949), 1920
 Strobe Talbott, 2016
 Ratan Tata, 2012
 Her Majesty Queen Te Atairangikaahu of New Zealand (1931–2006), 1970
 Tengku Ahmad Rithauddeen, 2018
 John Anthony Cecil Tilley (1869–1952)
 Tokugawa Yoshinobu (1837–1913), 1908
 Goh Chok Tong, 2011
 Matome Ugaki, ca. 1945.
 Cesar Virata, 2016
 Võ Hồng Phúc, 2012
 Wan Waithayakon
 Wang Jin-pyng (1957–), 2021
 Sir John Whitehead GCMG CVO (1932–2013), 2006
 Gough Whitlam, 2006
 Yi Kang, 1912

2nd Class, Gold and Silver Star 

 Mohammad Hossein Adeli (1953–), 2014
 Salem Ben Nasser Al-Ismaily, 2017
 Momofuku Ando (1910–2007), 2002
 Jaime Zóbel de Ayala (1934–), 2018
 Zeti Akhtar Aziz (1947–), 2017
 Sri Sultan Hamengkubuwano X (1946–), 2022
 Arden L. Bement, Jr. (1932–), 2009
 Jagdish Bhagwati (1934–), 2006
 Henryka Bochniarz(1947–), 2010
 Louis Bols (1867–1930), 1921
 Gustave Emile Boissonade (1825–1910), 1876
 Donald Prentice Booth (1902–1993), 1961
 Georges Hilaire Bousquet (1846–1937), 1898
 Jules Brunet (1838–1911)
 Horace Capron (1804–1885), 1884
 Chang Yung-fa (1927–2016), 2012
 Rita R. Colwell (1934–), 2005
 William Douglas Crowder, 2008
 Gerald Curtis, 2005
 Marzuki Darusman, 2017
 Sir Joseph Dimsdale (1849–1902), 1902
 Kiin Donarudo, 1993
Jonathan M. Dorfan (1947–), 2017
 Hugh Elles (1880–1945)
 José Manuel Entrecanales, 2018
 Predrag Filipov, 2019
 Bill Frenzel, 2000
 Thamir Ghadhban (1945–), 2016
 Thomas Blake Glover (1838–1911), 1908
 William Reginald Hall (1870–1943)
 Lionel Halsey (1872–1946)
 Mazie Hirono (1947– ), 2021
 Ho Mei-yueh (1951– ), 2021
 Kazuo Ishiguro (1954- ), 2018
 Mohamed Nouri Jouini, (2019)
 Onkar Singh Kanwar (1942–), 2018
 Donald Keene (1922–2019), 1973
 Michael Kirby, 2017
 Michał Kleiber, 2012
 David C. Knapp, (1927–2010)
 Tommy Koh, 2009
 Jeffrey Koo, 2012
George Trumbull Ladd (1842–1921)
 Cecil Lambert (1864–1928)
 Dan Larhammar (1956–), 2022
 Tsung-Dao Lee 2007
 Charles LeGendre (1830–1899), 1874
 Wassily Leontief (1905-1999), 1985 
 Lilia B. de Lima, 2006
 Yusron Ihza Mahendra (1958–), 2022
Abdul Gafoor Mahmud(1934-), 2017
 William Flynn Martin, 2018
 William R. Merz, 2021
 Connie Morella (1931–), 2016
 Riccardo Muti, 2016
 Thottuvelil Krishna Pillai Ayappan Nair 2015 
 Hideyo Noguchi (1876–1928), 1928
 George R. Packard 2007
 Jerzy Pomianowski
 Randles, Sir John Scurrah (1875–1945)
 Chintamani Nagesa Ramachandra Rao, 2015
 Rein Raud, 2011
 Governor J. Peter Ricketts, 2022
 Johannis de Rijke (1842–1913)
 Wilbur L. Ross (1937–), 2015
 Vsevolod Rudnev (1855–1913), 1907
 Saisho Atsushi, 1887
 Shyam Saran, 2019
 Jacob Schiff (1847–1920), 1907
 William Francis Sempill (1893–1965)
 N. K. Singh (2016)
 Jouko Skinnari, 2011
 E. Sreedharan (1932–), 2013
 Wendell M. Stanley (1904–1971), 1966
 Michael Ira Sovern 2003
 Sayidiman Suryohadiprojo (1927–2021), 2012
 Washington SyCip, 2017
 Henry W. Taft (1859–1945), 1929
 Frederick Charles Tudor Tudor (1863–1946)
 Charles Vaughan-Lee (1867–1928)
 John Waldron (1909–1975) 1971
 Bryon Wilfert (1952–), 2011
 Ernst-Ludwig Winnacker (1941–), 2009
 Richard J. Wood, 2010
 Kenkichi Yabashi (1869–1927), 1927
 Philip Yeo (1946–), 2007

3rd Class, Gold Rays with Neck Ribbon 

 Craig Agena (1960–), 2014
 John F. Aiso (1909–1987), 1985
 Giorgio Amitrano (1957–), 2020 (ceremony held in 2022)
 James E. Auer, 2009
 William Hansel Barrow (1936–2020), 2005
 William Sturgis Bigelow (1850–1926), 1909
 Edmund Blunden (1896–1974), 1963
 Ivan Bondarenko, 2012
 Richard Bowring (1947–), 2013
 Ben Nighthorse Campbell (1933–), 2011
 Kent E. Calder, 2014
 Ion Caramitru, 2017
 Kirsti Koch Christensen, 2006
 Albert Diamond Cohen, 2011
 Jennifer Corbett, 2014
 Edwin Cranston, 2009
 Rust Macpherson Deming, 2013
 Steven DeMoss, 2022
 Rudy Demotte, 2016
 Michael Donnelly, 2014
 Ronald P. Dore
 Todd A. Dozier, 2021
 Peter Drysdale, 2001
 Clint Eastwood, 2009
 Gustave Eiffel (1832–1923)
 Stanisław Filipek, 2006
 Jack Fujimoto, 2011
 Robert Garfias, 2005
 Carol Gluck, 2006
 William Elliot Griffis (1843–1928), 1926
 Mahdi Elmandjra, 1986
 Moto Hagio, 2022
 Percival Hall-Thompson (1874–1950)
 Jochem P. Hanse, 2007
 Helen Hardacre, 2018
 James Curtis Hepburn (1815–1911)
Judit Hidasi, 2005
 Yanosuke Hirai (1902–1986), 1972
 Irene Hirano (1948–2020), 2020
 John Charles Hoad (1856–1911), 1906
 Susumu Honjo, 2003
 Jiro Horikoshi (1903–1982), 1973
 Bill Hosokawa (1915–2007), 1987
 John Howes, (1924–2017), 2003
 Robert Huey, 2019
 Romuald Huszcza, 2012
 José Luis Ceacero Inguanzo, 1886
 Keiichi Ishizaka (1945–2016), 2015
 Muhammad Nurul Islam (1943–), 2012
 Jean-François Jarrige (1940–2014)
 Kanō Jigorō (1860–1938)
 Peter Jost (1921–2016), 2011
 Otto Hermann Kahn (1867–1934)
 Kusuma Karunaratne (1940–)
 Stephen Ira Katz, 2012
 Dr. Nghiem Vu Khai, 2014
 Harue Kitamura, 2004
 Larry Kominz, 2022
 George Koshi c. 1960
 George Trumbull Ladd (1842–1921)
 Miles Wedderburn Lampson (1880–1964)
Kuo-Hsiung Lee, 2011
 Yves Leterme, 2016
 Carlos Rubio López de la Llave, 2014
 Norman Macrae (1923–2010), 1988
 Paul Magnette, 2016
 William P. Malm, 2020
 Mike Masaoka, 1968
 Matthew H. Molloy, 2013
 Kyuzo Mifune (1883–1965), 1964
 John Milne (1850–1913)
 Earl Miner (1926–2004)
 Edwin McClellan (1925–2009), 1998
 Seang Nam, 2020
 Edward Gage Nelson, 2008
 Ian Nish, 1991
 Setsuko Matsunaga Nishi, 2009
 Jeanette Takamura, 2009
 Dr. Susumu Nisizaki, 2018
 Jerzy Nowacki, 2008
 John O'Conor, 2011
 Peter O'Malley, 2015
 Dennis M. Ogawa, 2016
 Taiichi Ohno, 1982
 Janusz Onyszkiewicz, 2019
 Piotr Paleczny, 2019
 T.J. Pempel, 2022
 Susan Pharr, 2008
 Umberto Pineschi, 2009
 Lee Poh Ping, 2010
 John Powles, 2008
 Pyle, Kenneth B. 1999
 John Mark Ramseyer, 2018
 Sadia Rashid, 2019
 Dzulkifli Abdul Razak, 2019
 Jacob Raz, 2006
 Rustum Roy, 2002
 David Rowe-Beddoe, 2008
 David Russell, 2010
 Raaj Kumar Sah, 2017
 Emiko "Emily" Sano, 2008
Wolfgang Sauerwein (1952–), 2020
Isaac Shapiro (1931–), 2006
David Bowman Schneder, 1936
 Edward Seidensticker, 1975
 Go Seigen aka Wu Qing Yuan (1914–2014), 1987
 John Stich, 2021
 William Forbes-Sempill
 Shinichi Suzuki (1898–1998), c. 1970
 George Tanabe, Jr., 2013
 Ichimatsu Tanaka (1895–1983), 1967
 Tadao Tannaka (1908–1986), 1980
 Patrick Lennox Tierney, 2007
 Royall Tyler, 2008 
 István Ujszászy (1894–1948), 1942
 Joseph K.H. Uy, 1991
 T. Wayland Vaughan (1870–1952), 1940
 Rudi Vervoort, 2016
 Andrzej Wajda, 1995
 Paul Watanabe, 2017
 Willy Vande Walle, 2006
 Sam Walsh, 2021
 R.J. Zwi Werblowsky, 2009
 Charles Wolf, Jr, 2007
 Lydia Yu-Jose, 2012
 Jan van Zanen, 2016

4th Class, Gold Rays with Rosette 

 Hank Aaron (1934–2021), 2016
 Ferran Adrià (1952–), 2015
 Toshiko Akiyoshi (1929–), 2004
 Syed Feroz Alam Shah, 2020
 Boris Akunin (1956–), 2009
 Arvydas Ališauskas, 2012
 Shusaku Arakawa (1936–2010), 2010
 Martha Argerich (1941–), 2005
 Charles Aznavour (1924–2018), 2018
 Kazuhiko Bandoh, 2014
 Andrej Bekeš, 2008
 Ilana Singer Blaine (b. 1961), 2021
 Henry Pike Bowie (1848–1920), 1909
 James R. Brandon, 1994
 William Penn Brooks, 1888
 Bobby Charlton, 2012
 Tim Clark (historian of Japanese art), 2020
 Willard G. Clark (1930–2015), 1991
 David Cope, 2012
 Charles B. Doleac, Esq., 2011
 Bogna Barbara Dziechciaruk-Maj, 2009
 William Elliot Griffis (1843–1928), 1907
 Kenji Ekuan (1925–2015), 2000
 Atsuko Toko Fish 2018
 Fujiko Fujio A (1934–), 2008
 Glen Gondo, 2013
 Ted Goossen, 2018
 Mohammad Hatta (1902–1980), 1943
  (1933–), 2011
 Steven Heine (1950–), 2007
 Asao Hirano (1926–2019), 2001
 Terumasa Hino (1942–), 2019
 Michael Arnold Hodgkin, 2019
 William Imbrie (1845–1928), 1909
 Iskandar Jalil, 2015
 Randall Sidney Jones, 2015
 Rena Kanokogi (1935-2009), 2008
 Gō Katō (1938–2018), 2008
 Kihachirō Kawamoto (1925–2010), 1995
 George Kerr (1937–), 2010
 Keisuke Kinoshita (1912–1998), 1984
 Joy Kogawa (1935–), 2010
 Sachi Koto (1951– ), 2021
 Włodzimierz Kwieciński (1955–), 2012
 Tommy Lasorda (1927–2021), 2008
 Liao I-chiu (1936–), 2014
 Charles Von Loewenfeldt, 1987
 Alfred Majewicz, 2002
 Leiji Matsumoto, 2010
 Hazel McCallion, 2014
 Rokusaburo Michiba, 2007
 Frank A. Miller, 1929
 Shiro Floyd Mori, 2012
 Raymond Moriyama (1928–), 2003
 Kent Nagano, 2008
 Masaya Nakamura (1925–2017), 2007
 Olivia Newton-John (1948–2022), 2021
 Hideyo Noguchi (1876–1928), 1915
 Krystyna Okazaki, 2007 
 David Ono, 2022
 Ivica Osim, 2016
 Daniel Ost, 2015
 Kenneth Oye, 2018
 Edwina Palmer, 2018
 Takao Saito, 2010
 Ian Michael Scher, 2021
 David Bowman Schneder, 1917
 Frederik L. Schodt, 2009
 Peter Schreier, 2019
 Dr. Manmohan Singh, 2007
 George Shima (1864–1926)
 Tatsuzo Shimaoka (1919–2007), 1999
 Setsuko Shinoda (1955–), 2020
 Joseph Bower Siddall (1840–1904), 1909
 Dragan Stojković (1965–), 2015
 Sukarno (1901–1970), 1943
 Koichi Sugiyama (1931–2021), 2018
 Hiroshi Tachi (1950–), 2020
 George Takei (1937–), 2004
 Kip Tokuda (1946–2013), 2012
 Masanobu Tsuji (1902–1961), 1942
 George Tsutakawa (1910–1997), 1981
 Morihei Ueshiba (1883–1969), 1964
 Raymond S. Uno, 2014
 H. Paul Varley (1931–2015), 1966
 The Ventures, 2010
 Sadao Watanabe (1933–), 2005
 Tetsuya Watari (1941–2020), 2013
 William Scott Wilson (1944–), 2015
 Teruaki Yamagishi (1934–), 2008

5th Class, Gold and Silver Rays 

 Miyazaki Atsuo (1947–), 2021
 Dick Beyer (1930–2019), 2017
 Vytautas Dumčius, 2016
 Douglas Erber, 2021
 Dr. Rupert Faulkner (Victoria & Albert Museum), 2020
 Shyamala Ganesh, 2021
 George Geddie (1869–1961), 1907
 Toshihiro Hamano, 2017
 Frances Hashimoto (1943–2012), 2012
 Takami Hibiya (1909-1993) 1981
 Abdullah Ibrahim (1934– ), 2020.
 Jan Kowalewski (1892–1965), 1923
 Kira Liscutín Córdova de Abreu (?–), 2021

 Glenn Masuo Masunaga (1925–2019), 1999
 Lori Matsukawa (1956– ), 2022
 Br. Jude McKenna OFM Cap (1935– ), 2019.
 Soleiman Mehdizadeh (1955– ), 2012
 Kenzo Mori (1914–2007), 2007
 Shōshin Nagamine (1907–1997), 1982
 Roy Masahiro Nagata, 2005
 Shūgorō Nakazato (1920–2016), 2007
 Kiyoshi Nishiyama (1893–1983), 1977
 Steere Noda, 1968
 Jun Noguchi, 2011
 Hironori Ōtsuka (1892–1982), 1966
 Sumitra Peries (1934–2023), 2021
 Vincenzo Ragusa (1841–1927), 1884
 Major Douglas Estment Randall, MC (1891–1926), 1925
 Antone Rosa (1855–1898), 1884
 Inés Sánchez (1931– ), 2012
 Buster Sefor (1941–), 2011* Low Thian Seng, 2015
 Garrett Serikawa (1932–2019), 2016
Doreen Simmons (1932–2018), 2017
 Yosihiko H. Sinoto (1924–2017), 1995
 Alfred Russell Stone (1902–1954), 1954
 James Takemori (1926–2015), 2004
 Seiichi Tanaka (1968– ), 2013
 Alicia Terada, 2017
 Rudolf Teusler (1876–1934)
 Ted Tsukiyama (1920–2019), 2001
 Ronald Stewart Watt (1947– ), 2010
 William Wheeler (1851–1932), 1924
Shuji Yagi (Shuho Bon Yagi), 2019
 Akira Yoshizawa (1911–2005), 1983

6th Class, Silver Rays 

 Fadi Aoun / Lebanon (2022)
 Henry Hajimu Fujii (1886–1976), 1971
 Kuniichi Iwata (Specialist) (1919–2014), 1995
 Bolesław Orliński (1899–1992), 1926
 Fudeko Reekie, 2013
 John Wilson (Captain) (1851–1899), 1895
 Yun Chi-sung (1875–1936), 1905

7th Class, Green Paulownia Leaves Medal 

In 2003, the 7th and 8th levels – named for leaves of the Paulownia tree, long used as a mon (emblem) for the highest levels of Japanese society – were moved to a new and distinct order, the single-class Order of the Paulownia Flowers.

 Leonard Kubiak (1899–1939), 1926
 Shōjiro Kuwazoe (1876-1953)https://www.familysearch.org/tree/person/memories/LYXL-XXQ(Mormon)

8th Class, white Paulownia Leaves Medal 

In 2003, the 7th and 8th levels – named for leaves of the Paulownia tree, long used as a mon (emblem) for the highest levels of Japanese society – were moved to a new and distinct order, the single-class Order of the Paulownia Flowers.

Class unknown 

 Aung San (1915–1947)
 Beneš, Edvard (1884–1948), 1928
 Ralph T. Browning (1941–2018)
 Burzagli, Ernesto (1873–1944), 1906
 Henry Clews (Awarded 1908)
 Craig, Albert M. (1988)
 de Bary, William Theodore (1993)
 Eichelberger, Robert Lawrence (1886–1961)
 Ellis, Alfred John (1915–2020), 1989
 Fortescue, Granville Roland (1875–1952)
 Gibney, Frank B. (1924–2006), 1976
 Józef Gieysztor
 Grondijs, Louis (1878–1961)
 Hosoya, Judayu (1840–1907)
 Ibrahim, Sultan of Johor (1873–1959)
 Knott, Cargill G. (1856–1922), 1891
 Wiesław Kotański, 1986
 Kunz, George Frederick (1856–1932)
 Charles de Limburg Stirum (1906–1989)
 Henryk Lipszyc, 1992
 McKenzie, Lionel W. (1995)
 Morrison, George F. (1867–1943)
 Musa Ghiatuddin Riayat Shah, Sultan of Selangor (1893–1955)
 Ozaki Yukio (1858–1954)
 Paine, Godfrey (1871–1932), 1918
 Patrick, Hugh Talbot 1994
Raymond, Rossiter W. (1840–1918)
 Takamine Hideo (1854–1910)
 Wasson, James R. (1847–1923), 1874
 Franciszek Ziejka
 Ivan Ivanovich Zarubin (1822–1902), 1881

See also 
 Order of merit: A list of orders by various states
 Systems of other states:
 Order of Civil Merit (Korea)
 Order of Chula Chom Klao and Order of the White Elephant (Thailand)
 Order of St. Michael and St. George (UK)
 Legion of Honour (France)
 Order of Merit of the Federal Republic of Germany (Grand Merit Cross, Merit Cross and Merit Medal equivalents)
 Order "For Merit to the Fatherland" (Russia)
 Order of Isabella the Catholic (Spain)
 Order of Merit of the Italian Republic
 Decoration of Honour for Services to the Republic of Austria (Grand Decoration in Gold with Sash, in Gold with Star, in Gold, Grand Decoration of Honour, Decoration of Honour in Gold, Decoration of Merit in Gold)
 Order of Prince Henry (Portugal)

References

Further reading 
 Peterson, James W., Barry C. Weaver and Michael A. Quigley (2001). Orders and Medals of Japan and Associated States. San Ramon, California: Orders and Medals Society of America. .

External links 

 Japan, Cabinet Office: Decorations and Medals
 Decoration Bureau: Order of the Rising Sun
 Japan Mint: Production Process

 
1875 establishments in Japan
Orders, decorations, and medals of Japan
Awards established in 1875